The year 2005 is the second year in the history of the Konfrontacja Sztuk Walki, a mixed martial arts promotion based in Poland. In 2005 Konfrontacja Sztuk Walki held 2 events beginning with, KSW III: Konfrontacja.

List of events

KSW III: Konfrontacja

KSW III: Konfrontacja was a mixed martial arts event held on January 15, 2005, at the Hotel Marriott in Warsaw, Poland.

Results

KSW IV: Konfrontacja

KSW IV: Konfrontacja was a mixed martial arts event held on September 10, 2005, at the Hotel Marriott in Warsaw, Poland. Mirko Cro Cop was a special guest during the event.

Results

See also 
 Konfrontacja Sztuk Walki

References

Konfrontacja Sztuk Walki events
2005 in mixed martial arts